Shioya Station is the name of three train stations in Japan:

 Shioya Station (Hokkaido) (塩谷駅)
 Shioya Station (Hyogo) (塩屋駅)
 Shioya Station (Kagawa) (塩屋駅)